is a Japanese light novel series written by Yū Moroboshi and illustrated by Mikihiro Amami. Fujimi Shobo has published fourteen volumes since July 2013 under their Fujimi Fantasia Bunko imprint. A manga adaptation with art by Arisu Shidō started serialization in Media Factory's seinen manga magazine Monthly Comic Alive from July 26, 2014. A 12-episode anime television series adaptation by Diomedéa aired between July 8, 2015 and September 23, 2015.

Plot
Humanity was driven off the land by the threat of magical armored insects and now live in aerial floating cities. Its defenses lie in wizards who fight the insects with magic in mid-air. Kanata Age is a young man who lives on the floating wizard academy city of "Misutogan." He was once celebrated as the "Black Master Swordsman," the elite ace of the S128 special team. However, he is now despised as the "traitor of the special team." One day, he is assigned as the instructor of E601, a team that has suffered over 100 consecutive defeats. E601 has three girls — Misora Whitale, Lecty Eisenach, and Rico Flamel — with one or two peculiar quirks.

Characters

Main characters

Formerly known as the ace of Platoon S128 and the strongest Sky Wizard, after a very dangerous mission that he completed successfully, he stopped going on missions, and now he's loathed as a traitor. He becomes the instructor of Platoon E601, hoping to improve their capabilities. He tends to be in situations where the girls label him as a pervert but is able to overcome the hurdles thrown at him.

The leader of Platoon E601. Despite having good speed and stamina, she's rather impulsive and not very good with her weapon or giving orders. When Kanata finds out her desire of being a Sword Sorcerer as a way of honoring her late mother, he decides to train her in order to make her improve. It is shown that she holds feelings for Kanata and usually gets jealous when he acts kindly towards Yuri.

Member of Platoon E601 with the role of close combat fighter. Despite being skilled with her weapon, she's incredibly shy and prone to apologizing a lot for no reason. In order to help her, Kanata makes her work at a maid cafe so she can talk to other people. She also has feelings for Kanata as he made her improve her lack of social skills and confidence.

Member of Platoon E601 with the role of sniper. While intelligent and good at shooting, she's narcissistic to the point of seeing herself as a goddess, not even bothering to practice. It turns out that a lot of her narcissism comes from feeling inferior towards her older sister, but Kanata helps her recover her will to fight. She has feelings for Kanata as well as he accepts her for who she really is.

Member of Platoon S128, who used to idolize Kanata, but since she was unconscious when he charged alone, she now sees him as a traitor like most of the academy. Whenever she sees him she always picks a fight with him however it is quite clear she is just trying to get his attention. Despite calling him a traitor, she still has feelings for him. After losing a bet against Kanata in the Mistgun tournament she joins Fireteam E601 with the rest of the girls.

Guard Captain of Platoon S128 and Kanata's childhood friend. She still defends Kanata's actions and later recommended him to be the instructor of Platoon E601.

Another member of Platoon S128. Like Chloe, he doesn't see Kanata as a traitor. Kanata seems to be quite good friends with him as they can be seen chatting quite often.

Rico's older sister and supervisor of the Sky Wizard Platoons. Despite disliking her sister's attitude, she occasionally asks Chloe about her progress. But seeing Kanate the "traitor", training Platoon E601 for the Mistgun tournament, she's arrogantly adamant in getting rid of Kanate and his platoon. Includes asking Yuri to try to get her team to win.

Other characters

A member of the medical division who develops a crush on Yuri although his crush is what leads to his decision to gain power through nefarious ways and succumbing to possession by the sky beetles; he almost destroyed the academy. He is the main antagonist in the anime.

Greg Hastuck

Socie Whitale

Misora's late mother and Sky Wizard. While she was an excellent fighter, she was rather silly and clumsy at home, much to the annoyance of her husband and daughter. When she was killed in action by the Armored Insects, everyone she knew except Misora forgot about her.

Gail Whitale

Misora's widowed father, who is a Normal and owner of a restaurant. He forgot about his wife when she was killed by the Insects and now he worries that if Misora dies, he will also forget her.

Media

Light novels
The first light novel volume was published by Fujimi Shobo under their Fujimi Fantasia Bunko imprint on July 20, 2013. As of July 2017, fourteen volumes have been published.

Anime
A 12-episode anime television series adaptation by Diomedéa aired between July 8, 2015 and September 23, 2015. Two pieces of theme music are used. The opening theme, titled "D.O.B.", is performed by Iori Nomizu. The ending theme is "Hallelujah" performed by la la larks.

Episode list

Reception
The anime series' first episode garnered negative reviews from Anime News Network's staff during the Summer 2015 season previews. Nick Creamer put it alongside Absolute Duo and World Break for being a "cheap anime promo for a light novel fantasy-action harem", criticizing the first half for its "long, budget-efficient monologue" and the second half containing outdated and cliché humor from its given genre, concluding that its "very lethargically paced, heavy on unnecessary exposition and slow in the introduction of its obvious premise." Bamboo Dong found the opening action scene dull and poorly animated, and saw the anime being "creatively bankrupt" with its premise, characters and jokes. Hope Chapman felt the episode represented Diomedéa taking Studio ARMS' position of producing low budget, schlocky trash with a "distinctly light-novel flavor", saying "[T]here's nothing pretty to look at, no endearing characters, not a drop of originality in the plot, and it's just plain no fun to watch." Theron Martin gave credit to the character designs and development of Kanata but felt it wasn't enough to excuse the less than enthusiastic execution of the overall story, characters and visuals, calling it "a limp, painfully directive waste of effort." Fellow ANN editor Rebecca Silverman reviewed the complete anime series in 2016. She commended the effort made to give character development to its cast (singling out Real for being "the most extreme and interesting") and was surprised by the good background music, but was critical of the overall stockiness of the cast, awkward animation in both character anatomy and movements, and poor story developments concluding that "this is just like every other magic high school harem show, from the characters to the story arcs, and it ends with questions remaining that we aren't likely to get answered any time soon."

References

External links
Official anime website 

2013 Japanese novels
2015 anime television series debuts
Anime and manga based on light novels
Crunchyroll anime
Diomedéa
Fujimi Fantasia Bunko
Harem anime and manga
Japanese fantasy novels
Light novels
Madman Entertainment anime
Media Factory manga
Kadokawa Dwango franchises
Seinen manga
Tokyo MX original programming